In 2015, 43.5% of the United Kingdom's municipal waste was recycled, composted or broken down by anaerobic digestion. The majority of recycling undertaken in the United Kingdom is done by statutory authorities, although commercial and industrial waste is chiefly processed by private companies. Local Authorities are responsible for the collection of municipal waste and operate contracts which are usually kerbside collection schemes. The Household Waste Recycling Act 2003 required local authorities in England to provide every household with a separate collection of at least two types of recyclable materials by 2010. Recycling policy is devolved to the administrations of Scotland, Northern Ireland and Wales who set their own targets, but all statistics are reported to Eurostat.

Incentives
Local Authorities are given incentives towards meeting recycling targets set by European, national and regional Government by the imposition of financial penalties for failing to recycle. For example, levies are imposed on the proportion of waste material going to landfill under a landfill tax, which currently stands at £94.15 per tonne.

Unlike other European countries, there are very few deposit-refund schemes in operation. The Defra Packaging Strategy of 2009 supported reward-based programmes, but other than some trials in Scotland, they have received almost no public or political attention. This may be due to the lack of evidence that they improve the recycling rate in a UK context. In December 2018, the Department for Business, Energy & Industrial Strategy (DEFRA) has announced plans for a pledge of up to £60m towards innovative new packaging. One initiative in this is to assess the viability of household food waste being "transformed into environmentally-friendly plastic bags and cups."

The establishment of the government body Waste & Resources Action Programme has increased the country's recycling capacity. It is a registered charity. It works with businesses, individuals and communities to achieve a circular economy through helping them reduce waste, develop sustainable products and use resources in an efficient way. WRAP was established in 2000 as a company limited by guarantee. and receives funding from the Department for Environment, Food and Rural Affairs, the Northern Ireland Executive, Zero Waste Scotland, the Welsh Government and the European Union.

Household recycling 

UK domestic recycling policy is geared towards encouraging individuals to recycle in their own homes, through regulation and public awareness campaigns. These include fines for people who don't cut their household waste and a greater emphasis on separating waste into different recyclable materials, with each council applying different rules. Their focus is shifting toward encouraging recycling, rather than punishing households for non-recycled waste.

Recycling is most efficient when items are reused around the home rather than discarded. Other approaches include taking glass items to bottle banks at supermarkets and composting biodegradable waste, making landfill unnecessary.

According to the latest figures from Defra:
44.3% of household waste was recycled in 2015
There was a 235% increase in household recycling in England between 2000/01 and 2009/10.
26.7 million tonnes of household waste was generated in 2015, of which ~11.6 million tonnes was recycled, reused or composted.
In 2015, dry recycling was the largest component of recycled waste, comprising 59% of the total.

A 2018 survey by the Ball Corporation studied the publics concerns and thoughts on recycling in the UK:
86% of all British adults claim to be worried about the matter, and 90% of the people aged 55 and above show the most concern. 
Despite this, only 67% claim to 'often' take action to reduce plastic pollution, for example by recycling and changing shopping habits to buy alternatives to disposable plastic.

Industrial recycling 
Commercial and industrial (C&I) waste makes up a large proportion of the UK's waste. According to DEFRA, 48 million tonnes of C&I waste was generated in England in 2009, down from 67.9 million tonnes 6 years earlier. Furthermore, 52% of C&I waste was reused or recycled, compared to just 42% in 2002/03. This figure is also greater than the household recycling rate. The industrial and service sectors generate roughly equal amounts of waste with similar recycling rates, even though the service sector is economically larger. The reporting of C&I waste statistics has not always met the European Commission's standards, with local councils using different methodologies for their statistics. There has also been no comprehensive survey of C&I waste since 2003.

The European Union 
The EU has introduced a number of directives which determine the targets of UK domestic recycling policy:

The 1999 Landfill Directive is one of the most important of these, which demands a reduction in the amount of waste being sent to landfill from 11.2 million tonnes in 2010 to 7.46 million tonnes in 2013

In 2010, Defra claimed that the UK would meet its first landfill diversion target, which was 75% on 1995 levels, and that it is ‘on track’ to meet the next targets in 2013 (50% on 1995 levels) and 2020 (35% on 1995 levels).

The EU Waste Framework Directive states that the UK must recycle 50% of household waste by 2020, which includes composting and reusing waste. It also stipulates a 70% minimum recycling target for construction and demolition waste by 2020. The British government is highly confident in meeting the 2020 recycling target, but there is a lower level of certainty with the 2020 Landfill Directive target. There may not be enough time to construct the necessary facilities for organic waste.

Main aspects of UK recycling policy 

UK recycling policy aims to improve recycling methods and levels across the UK, focusing on glass, paper, plastic and metal cans.

Glass 
Glass can be recycled in the form of bottles and jars which are crushed down and then melted. Glass can be recycled infinitely because it does not lose any of its quality. It uses a lot less energy, fewer raw materials and produces less CO2 than manufacturing glass from scratch. The main difficulty with recycling glass is the need to remove the unwanted materials that contaminate it and avoiding the mixing of different colours.

Glass collection points, known as Bottle Banks are very common near shopping centres, at civic amenity sites and in local neighbourhoods in the United Kingdom. Bottle Banks commonly stand beside collection points for other recyclable waste like paper, metals and plastics. Local, municipal waste collectors usually have one central point for all types of waste in which large glass containers are located. There are now over 50,000 bottle banks in the United Kingdom, and 752,000 tons of glass are now recycled annually.

The waste recycling industry in the UK cannot consume all of the recycled container glass that will become available over the coming years, mainly due to the colour imbalance between that which is manufactured and that which is consumed. The UK imports much more green glass in the form of Wine bottles than it uses, leading to a surplus amount for recycling. The resulting surplus of green glass from imported bottles may be exported to producing countries, or used locally in the growing diversity of secondary end uses for recycled glass.

Paper 
All types of waste paper are recyclable, and recycled paper requires a lot less energy and fewer raw materials to produce than manufacturing it from scratch. However, paper cannot be recycled indefinitely, and the normal number of times it can be recycled is about six. 12.5 million tonnes of paper and cardboard are used annually in England.

Plastic 
In the UK, the amount of post-consumer plastic being recycled is relatively low, due in part to a lack of recycling facilities. The challenge with recycling plastic lies in sorting differing types of plastic, often by hand, which slows the process. The Plastics 2020 Challenge was founded in 2009 by the plastics industry with the aim of engaging the British public in a nationwide debate about the use, reuse and disposal of plastics, and hosts a series of debates on its website framed around the waste hierarchy.

Metal cans 
There is a high recycling rate for metal cans in the UK, with aluminium recycling and steel cans being the most common items. Metal can be recycled indefinitely, and aluminium cans use just 5% of the energy needed to produce them from scratch and only release 5% of the amount of greenhouse gases. In addition, it is the easiest material to extract and separate from the other recyclables, using magnets for steel cans and special magnets (eddy currents) it guarantees recycling of every can.

Other materials

Cartons 
In 2013, the Alliance for Beverage Cartons and the Environment and Sonoco Alcore opened the UK's first carton recycling facility in Halifax. Prior to this, recycling was limited because of the high shipping costs for export, but the new plant processes 40 percent of the country's carton waste. Problems also arise because cartons cannot use recycled fibre, so they are converted into cardboard instead.

Electronics 
The European Union implemented the Waste Electrical and Electronic Equipment Directive (WEEE Directive, 2002/96/EC) in February 2003. It requires manufacturers to shoulder the burden of recycling by reimbursing the recyclers' costs. It also set a minimum quota of 4 kg per capita of e-waste per head by 2009.

The United Kingdom was the final member state to pass it into law. The success of the WEEE directive has varied significantly from state to state, with collection rates varying between 13 kilograms per capita per annum to as little as 1 kg per capita per annum.  Computers & electronic wastes collected from households within Europe are treated under the WEEE directive via Producer Compliance Schemes (whereby manufacturers of Electronics pay into a scheme that funds its recovery from household waste recycling centres (HWRCs)) and nominated Waste Treatment Facilities (known as Obligated WEEE).

However, recycling of ex corporate Computer Hardware and associated electronic equipment falls outside the Producer Compliance Scheme (Known as non-obligated). In the UK, Waste or obsolete corporate related computer hardware is treated via third party Authorized Treatment Facilities, who normally impose a charge for its collection and treatment.

Local councils and recycling 
Although recycling is required right across the UK, recycling rules differ depending on the local council. Some local councils have implemented a one-box system for separating household waste, whereas others have provided many more boxes, and this recyclable waste is often collected at different times from standard landfill waste collections.

There are also different schemes in place across the country to determine where the waste goes and how it is used.

In England, the local authorities are given targets by Defra. It is these local targets which help the government to achieve its national targets. However, local authorities are given flexibility in deciding how to best meet these targets, hence the number of different schemes in place.

London 
The issue of waste management and recycling is acute in London - the capital produces 17 million tonnes of waste each year, forecast to rise to 26.5 million tonnes in 2020. The Mayor's Greater London Authority sets the framework for dealing with waste within a London-wide Municipal Waste Management Strategy including recycling targets for the London Boroughs to meet, which are made statutory within the London Plan. The existing organisational arrangements however are complex with a number of waste disposal authorities at sub-regional and local levels.

Birmingham 
Birmingham City Council have introduced three kerbside collection schemes.

 Paper & Card Recycling (Blue Bag/Box). Introduced 2003. Container emptied every 2 weeks.
 Plastic Bottles (PET & HDPE), Glass, Aluminium & Tins Recycling (Green Box). Introduced 2005. Container emptied every 2 weeks.
 Garden Waste Recycling (Green Sacks). Introduced 2005. In 2014, Birmingham City Council introduced a £35 a year charge to have a garden waste wheelie bin, which caused huge numbers of complaints

These three schemes are now available to most of Birmingham's homes depending on whether they have a garden. The Paper & Garden Waste recycling facility is available to all houses in Birmingham. The Green Box scheme is going to be available to all houses later this year. Every year 3500 tonnes of paper and 8900 tonnes of wood are recycled. There are five household recycling centres and over 400 recycling banks across the whole of Birmingham.

Recycling banks normally include:
 Paper & Card Recycling
 Glass Recycling
 Clothes Recycling
 Shoes Recycling
 Textiles Recycling
 Aluminium Cans Recycling

Newcastle-under-Lyme
Newcastle-under-Lyme Borough Council now has a six bin collection scheme.

 Food caddy for food waste. Collected weekly.
 Red box for metal and plastic. Collected weekly.
 Green box for glass and cardboard. Collected weekly.
 Blue box for paper, small appliances, batteries, textiles and clothing. Collected weekly.
 Brown-lid 240L wheelie bin for garden waste. Collected fortnightly, alternately with non-recyclables.
 Black-lid 180L wheelie bin for non-recyclables. Collected fortnightly, alternately with garden waste.

There has been criticism from residents of Newcastle-under-Lyme after the council spent £2.4 million to improve its recycling in the borough, however the fleet of new vehicles are too wide to fit down some narrow roads. This has left some residents going for up to a fortnight without any waste collection service.

Criticisms 
There have been a number of controversies in recent years involving the recycling policies of various local councils:

Multiple containers 
One of the major problems for recycling at home has been the provision of multiple containers to sort the waste. This has been criticised for being too confusing for many residents, with one of the biggest offenders being the Newcastle-under-Lyme council which implemented a nine-bin system in 2010. Other councils have provided up to seven bins, although some private contractors provide only one, and separate the recyclable material themselves.

Fortnightly collections 
When fortnightly collections were brought in during 2007, they caused a lot of controversy. Many people were against them because it meant that they had to keep hold of their waste for longer and it was feared that this could be unhygienic, with fears arising in the press about health problems being caused as a result. However research conducted by Cranfield University and Enviros in 2007, found that there is unlikely to be significantly greater health issues relating to fortnightly collections against weekly.

In January 2014 the Secretary Of State for Communities and Local Government outlined guidance for how weekly collections could be achieved by local authorities. This was supported by a £250 million scheme made available to participating waste authorities. The Chartered Institution of Wastes Management (CIWM) questioned “whether the focus of the £250 million fund will deliver the
best environmental and economic outcomes” and suggested that the money could better be spent on alternative options. It went on:

'the additional money could more usefully have been focused on delivering improvements in three key areas: supporting more recycling, either by expanding the range of materials collected or improving participation; supporting an expansion in food waste collections, which is the main area of householder concern regarding collection frequency; and supporting waste prevention initiatives... In economic terms, with so many constraints on council budgets, it is important to ensure that this policy initiative does not lock local councils into significantly higher waste collection costs, for which we will all have to foot the bill long after the Weekly Collections Support Scheme funding has run dry'.

See also 
British Metals Recycling Association
Waste Disposal Authorities in Greater London
Recycling in Northern Ireland

References

Further reading

External links 

Waste and recycling page at DEFRA
 Recycling Policy Document
 Recycling Guide
Recycling at the Birmingham City Council